The Tractatus de Herbis is an illustrated treatise of medicinal plants painted in 1440. It is housed under shelfmark Sloane MS 4016 in the British Library, in London.

Background 

The Medieval medicine of Western Europe was much influenced by the many groups who contributed to the make-up of society. The contributions of Byzantine, Arabic and Mozarabic physicians were introduced into the Greek foundational texts of medicine, as was also the knowledge of people from further afield across the borders of the western world. Among the many results of this multiplicity of ethnic groups and cultures, medicinal plants had many different names coming from the several groups who were using them to prepare remedies. Such diversity was a source of confusions. To avoid the danger possibly generated by confusion between plants, apothecaries and physicians compiled dictionaries of plant names and commissioned albums with representations of the plants and other materia medica (animal and mineral) they used in their daily medical practice.

The Tractatus de Herbis is one such work linking the different plant names to the plants themselves through the mediation of the image. This made it possible to avoid confusion and, consequently, the risk of administering to a patient a plant different from the one prescribed by the physician. The Tractatus was produced to enable physicians, apothecaries and others identify the plants they used regardless of their nationality and language. the earliest surviving version, from the early 14th century (before 1330) and now known as Egerton 747, and in the British Library was relatively unknown till 1950, following which it was realised that there was a whole family of herbals with a common ancestor, which became collectively known as the Tractatus de herbis. These fall into two main groups, The North Italian Group (including British Library Sloane MS 4016 and the French group (including British Library Egerton MS 747).

In some manuscripts, such illustrative albums do not contain any text, but only the names of the plants in the language of the several groups present in medieval society. These albums with multilingual lists of plant names were visual aids which allowed for easy identification of the plants to be used in the practice of remedial therapy. Their representations of materia medica were much more efficient than words to make transcultural exchanges possible.

These illustrated works transformed the whole field of botanical literature. From translators/interpreters aimed to make it possible to associate one plant with its names in different languages and populations, they became reference  works which made unnecessary to include plant representations in botanical and medical treatises. They became reference works of a new type which could be consulted and used by readers of any language.

Description

The Egerton manuscript, the earliest version and acquired by the British Museum in 1839, is incomplete. The Sloane manuscript is a volume with 109 folios of large parchment, (365 mm x 265 mm) It is illustrated with nearly 500 polychrome representations of plants, animals and minerals, which were all used as primary materials to produce drugs.

These illustrations also include some people (ff. 2r, 44v, 98v), a mummy (f. 62r), animals’ parts (antlers, for example, on f. 34v), and manufactured by-products (wax, f. 30r).
Though this manuscript lacks a signature, colophon, or any indication of its provenance or date, it has traditionally been considered to be of North Italian origin, most likely from the Lombardy region from about 1440 judging from its Gothic-style script. Later, it belonged to the Marquis of Magny,  (1643-1721), then to the English collector Hans Sloane (1660-1753), before it became part of the collections of the British Museum in 1839.

Reproductions
In 2002 the Folio Society reproduced the Tractatus de Herbis in a numbered limited edition of 1000, accompanied by a commentary volume written by Minta Collins with list of plants compiled by Sandra Raphael. In 2011 the Spanish publishing house M. Moleiro Editor produced a facsimile edition of the Tractatus de Herbis. This edition limited to 987 copies comes with a companion volume by Historian of Science and Medicine Alain Touwaide of the Institute for the Preservation of Medical Traditions and the (Smithsonian Institution).

Notes

References

Bibliography 

 
 
 
 British Library
 
 

15th-century illuminated manuscripts
Scientific illuminated manuscripts
Herbals
Sloane manuscripts
1440 works
Treatises